Ma'ale Shomron is an Israeli settlement in the northern West Bank. Located about 300 metres above sea level, it is organised as a community settlement and falls under the jurisdiction of Shomron Regional Council. In 2019 it had a population of 996.

The international community considers Israeli settlements in the West Bank illegal under international law, but the Israeli government disputes this.

History
The settlement was established in February 1980 by a mixed group of Orthodox and non-religious Israelis from the Beitar and Herut movements. It is closely bordered by Karnei Shomron.

According to ARIJ, Israel confiscated land from several Palestinian villages in order to construct Ma'ale Shomron, including 268 dunums of land from Azzun, 69 dunams from Deir Istiya, and 367 dunums of land from Kafr Thulth / Arab Al Khouleh (including land for Karnei Shomron and Emmanuel).

Notable residents
Dani Dayan, chairman of Yad Vashem, former Consul General of Israel in New York City and former head of Yesha Council

References

External links
Official website

Mixed Israeli settlements
Populated places established in 1980
1980 establishments in the Israeli Military Governorate
Israeli settlements in the West Bank